The nineteenth season of the American animated sitcom South Park premiered on Comedy Central on September 16, 2015, and ended on December 9, 2015, containing ten episodes. As with most seasons of the show, all episodes are written and directed by series co-creator and co-star Trey Parker. The Blu-Ray and DVD sets were released exclusively to Best Buy on August 16, 2016, and were available worldwide on September 6.

Much like the previous season, this season features an episode-to-episode continuity, (which the creators called 'serialized lite') with political correctness as a recurring theme. This season introduced PC Principal as a new major character, replacing South Park Elementary's previous principal, Principal Victoria.

This season featured planned "dark weeks", weeks where no new episodes aired. These were after episode three, episode six, and episode eight.

Episodes

Reception

James Poniewozik of The New York Times considered it a revitalizing season for the series, praising its "ambitious, serialized story" and characterizing it as "something like a grand—if messy—unified theory of anger, inequality and disillusionment in 2015 America."

References

External links

Press release from South Park Studios for Season 19

2015 American television seasons